Jebalbarez-e Jonubi District (meaning "South Jebalbarez District") is a district (bakhsh) in Anbarabad County, Kerman Province, Iran. At the 2006 census, its population was 23,912, in 4,930 families.  The district has one city; Mardehek. The district has three rural districts (dehestan): Garmsar Rural District, Mardehek Rural District, and Nargesan Rural District.

References 

Anbarabad County
Districts of Kerman Province